Jena-Zwätzen station is a railway station in Jena, Thuringia, Germany.

References

Railway stations in Thuringia
Buildings and structures in Jena
Railway stations in Germany opened in 1877